The Vanuatu national handball team is the national handball team of Vanuatu.

Oceania Nations Cup record

References

External links
IHF profile

Men's national handball teams
National sports teams of Vanuatu